Derek Hansen (London, 1944) is a novelist and short story writer. He is the author of the 1993 book Lunch With The Generals. Hansen is known for his four book Lunch with... Series.

He was born in England, raised in New Zealand.  He now lives in Sydney, Australia. Derek Hansen's works have been published in the US, United Kingdom, Europe and China. He is married, and has two adult children.

He published his first short story at the age of 16 The Albertian, the magazine of  his secondary school, Mount Albert Grammar School.  At age 20 Hansen moved to London to work for J. Walter Thompson, and went on to run his own advertising agency.  After twenty years, he sold his ad agency and wrote Lunch with the Generals.

Hansen's the most popular book, Sole Survivor had gone through 17 printings by 2005. Tim Pankhurst, editor of The Press, describes Hansen's fishing books, which draws on his New Zealand childhood and passion for fishing, as "Hansen's fishing books are the ones that get away. Lend them and they won't come back."

Bibliography
Novels
Sole Survivor(1997)
Lunch with the Generals(1993)
Lunch with Mussolini (1994)
Lunch with the Station Master (2002)
Lunch with a Soldier (2004)
Blockade (1998)
Perfect Couple (2000)
Remember me (2007)
A Man You Can Bank On (2011)

Short stories
Dead Fishy (1995)
Psycho Cat (1996)
Something Fishy (2005)

References

External links
Author's Site

1944 births
Living people
20th-century Australian novelists
21st-century Australian novelists
Australian male novelists
Australian people of Scandinavian descent
Australian people of Norwegian descent
Australian male short story writers
20th-century Australian short story writers
21st-century Australian short story writers
20th-century Australian male writers
21st-century Australian male writers